The Diocese of Austin is a Latin Church ecclesiastical territory, or diocese, of the Catholic Church comprising 25 counties of Central Texas in the United States.  The diocese estimates a population of over 625,000 Catholics. 

As of 2021, the Diocese of Austin had 216 priests (168 active, 48 retired); 240 permanent deacons (160 active, 80 retired); and approximately 30 brothers and 84 sisters. It is a suffragan diocese in the ecclesiastical province of the metropolitan Archdiocese of Galveston-Houston.

Territory 
The Diocese of Austin includes 123 parishes and missions and six Catholic student centers at universities. The diocese boundaries are:

 West, Texas in the north
 San Marcos in the south
 Bryan - College Station in the east
 Mason in the west. 

The largest metropolitan areas in the diocese are Austin, Bryan - College Station, the Killeen – Temple – Fort Hood area and Waco.

History

1690 to 1947 
The first Catholic mission in Texas, then part of the Spanish Empire, was San Francisco de los Tejas. It was founded by Franciscan Father Damián Massanet in 1690 in the Weches area. The priests left the mission after three years, then established a second mission, Nuestro Padre San Francisco de los Tejas. near present day Alto in 1716.

In 1839, after the 1836 founding of the Texas Republic, Pope Gregory XVI erected the prefecture apostolic of Texas, covering its present day area.  The prefecture was elevated to a vicariate apostolic in 1846, the year that Texas became an American state. On May 4, 1847, Pope Pius IX elevated the vicariate into the Diocese of Galveston. The Austin area would remain part of several Texas dioceses for the next 139 years.

1947 to 1987 
Pope Pius XII erected the Diocese of Austin on November 15, 1947, and named Reverend Louis Reicher of the Diocese of Galveston as its first bishop.  During his tenure, Reicher built or restored over 200 churches and facilities, including a chancery office, Holy Cross Hospital in East Austin, Texas, Newman Centers on five college campuses, and six church-sponsored, low-rent housing projects. In 1964, Reicher transferred all of his personal wealth, approximately $5 million, to a trust fund providing direct assistance to the poor and sick along with low-interest loans to church institutions. 

In early, 1971, Pope Paul VI named Bishop Vincent Harris of the Diocese of Beaumont as coadjutor bishop of the Diocese of Austin to assist Reicher.  After Reicher retired later that year, Harris automatically replaced him.

While bishop, Harris was involved in a lawsuit against the Reichler trust fund. In July 1973, the Sacred Congregation for Bishops and the Sacred Congregation for the Clergy in Rome ruled that the Diocese of Austin should control the fund.  Citing Texas law, the fund administrators refused to surrender control.  Harris then filed suit against the trust.  In the lawsuit, the diocese claimed that diocesan funds had gone into the trust fund.  In response to the church position, Reicher made this statement:Never were any funds of any diocese used in creating this trust . . . Let me assure you that I have not alienated any diocesan property.”After two years of litigation, the two parties reached a settlement.  Harris retired in 1984.

1987 to present 
To replace Harris, Pope John Paul II appointed Auxiliary Bishop John E. McCarthy of the Diocese of Galveston-Houston as the next bishop of Beaumont In 1987, McCarthy attended the National Black Catholic Congress. After returning to Austin, he established the Office of Black Catholics to focus on African American ministry within the diocese. McCarthy encouraged parishes to focus on their social advocacy and charity work. He also established missionary programs both abroad and at home.  McCarthy established the Diocesan Law Project, which recruited hundreds of attorneys and interpreters to volunteer legal services for the needy. 

Auxiliary Bishop Gregory Aymond of the Archdiocese of New Orleans was named as coadjutor bishop of Austin by John Paul II in 2000 to assist McCarthy.  Aymond became bishop automatically after McCarthy retired in 2001.The diocese grew rapidly (partly as a result of immigration) during Aymond's bishopric and actually had more churchgoers than many archdioceses, including New Orleans after Hurricane Katrina.After appointing Aymond as archbishop of New Orleans in 2009, Pope Benedict XVI in 2010 named Auxiliary Bishop Joe S. Vazquez of the Archdiocese of Galveston-Houston as the new bishop of Austin .

As of 2023, Joe Vazquez is the bishop of the Diocese of Austin. In  2015, Pope Francis appointed Reverend Daniel E. Garcia as the first auxiliary bishop in the diocese. At the time of his appointment, Garcia was serving as vicar general and moderator of the curia. Garcia was named bishop of the Diocese of Monterey in 2010 by Francis.

Sex abuse 
The Diocese of Austin and Bishop Vazquez were sued in 2018 by six women who claimed they were sexually harassed as adults by Reverend Isidore Ndagizimana at St. Thomas More Parish in Austin.  After receiving their complaints, the diocese had sent Ndagizimana away for four months of treatment in Houston, then reassigned him to a different parish.

In 2019, the Diocese of Austin released a list of 22 clerics with credible accusations of sexual abuse of minor.

Bishops

Bishops of Austin
 Louis Joseph Reicher (1947-1971)
 Vincent Madeley Harris (1971-1985; Coadjutor 1971)
 John E. McCarthy (1985-2001)
 Gregory Michael Aymond (2001-2009; Coadjutor 2000-2001), appointed Archbishop of New Orleans
 Joe S. Vásquez (2010–present)

Former Auxiliary Bishop of Austin
Daniel E. Garcia (2015–2019), appointed Bishop of Monterey

Other bishops who were diocesan priests
 Patrick Zurek, appointed Bishop of Amarillo in 2008
William Mulvey, appointed Bishop of Corpus Christi in 2010
Michael J. Sis, appointed Bishop of San Angelo in 2013
David A. Konderla, appointed Bishop of Tulsa in 2016
William Albert Wack, CSC, appointed Bishop of Pensacola-Tallahassee in 2017

Coat of arms
The coat of arms of the diocese is based on an old coat of arms associated with early Austen or Austin families (in honor of Stephen F. Austin), adapted to express appropriate religious symbolism.

Other facilities
The diocese operates the Cedarbrake Catholic Retreat Center in Belton, Texas.

Education

High schools 
 Holy Trinity Catholic High School, Temple
 St. Louis Reicher Catholic High School, Waco
 St. Joseph Catholic High School, Bryan
 St. Michael's Catholic Academy, Austin
 San Juan Diego Catholic High School, Austin
 St. Dominic Savio Catholic High School, Austin
 St. Mary's Catholic School, Taylor

Financial status
The Central Administrative Office of the diocese showed revenues of $37.0 million for the fiscal year ending June 2022.

References

External links 
Roman Catholic Diocese of Austin Official Site

 
Austin
Christian organizations established in 1947
Austin
Austin
1947 establishments in Texas
Organizations based in Austin, Texas